"Puss"/"Oh, the Guilt" is a split single from the American rock bands The Jesus Lizard and Nirvana, released via Touch and Go Records.

Recording and release

It was released on February 15, 1993, and includes the songs "Puss" by the Jesus Lizard and "Oh, the Guilt" by Nirvana. The cover art for the single is a painting by Malcolm Bucknall called "Old Indian and White Poodle". "Puss"/"Oh, the Guilt" peaked at number 12 on the UK singles chart; it was The Jesus Lizard's first and only hit single in the UK, and Nirvana's sixth.

"Puss" first appeared on the 1992 album, Liar and was recorded by Steve Albini, who would later record Nirvana's third and final album, In Utero. The video for "Puss" showed a man being welded in a chair, so it was banned from some television stations.

"Oh, the Guilt" was recorded by Barrett Jones on April 7, 1992 in Seattle, Washington. The song was re-released in 2004 on the Nirvana rarities box set, With the Lights Out, and in 2005 on the compilation album, Sliver: The Best of the Box, although on these latter releases the song was remixed by Adam Kasper, and does not include the sound of lighter clicks present on the original mix.

A review in British music magazine, Music Week, described "Oh, the Guilt" as a "rougher, underproduced example of their pop-metal" and "Puss" as "a fiercer, messier hardcore thang". 

In an August 1993 Billboard article about the Touch and Go record label, the "Puss / Oh, the Guilt" split single is described as having "sold in great numbers".

Track listing

Charts

Unreleased versions

Nirvana recorded an instrumental demo version of "Oh, the Guilt" on January 1, 1991, at The Music Source studios in Seattle, Washington, but it remains officially unreleased. At the same studio session the band also recorded demo versions of songs "Aneurysm", "Even In His Youth", "All Apologies", "On a Plain", "Radio Friendly Unit Shifter", and "Token Eastern Song". All of these also remain officially unreleased except for "Aneurysm" and "Even In His Youth" which featured as B-sides to the "Smells Like Teen Spirit" single, and "All Apologies" which was released on the 20th anniversary deluxe and super-deluxe versions of the In Utero album in 2013.

References

External links

The (Unofficial) Jesus Lizard Discography Version 4.3
The LiveNIRVANA.com companion to official releases

1993 singles
Oh, the Guilt
Oh, the Guilt
Split singles
Oh, the Guilt
Touch and Go Records EPs
The Jesus Lizard songs